Dante Spinetta (born December 9, 1976 in Buenos Aires, Argentina) is an Argentine singer/composer who is part of the duo Illya Kuryaki and the Valderramas.

Biography 
Spinetta was born on December 9, 1976; he is the son of the musician Luis Alberto Spinetta. At the age of 14 he started recording hip hop tunes.

In 2001 he married choreographer Majo Carnero and had a son, Brando de Dios and daughter Vida Uniqua.

Musical career 
In 1990 Spinetta joined Emmanuel Horvilleur to form the hip-hop duo Illya Kuryaki and the Valderramas. Together, they recorded seven albums and received several awards, including some Gold and Platinum albums.

After 10 years, the duo split and they decided to continue their careers as solo artists.

His first album Elevado was released in 2002. The album contained 17 songs, while first single released for this album was "Donde Vas" which was launched with a promotional video. In 2007 he released his second album, El Apagón, in which he experiments with reggaeton elements added to the hip-hop and rap styles used in his previous work.

Some other artists have recorded songs with him, like Julieta Venegas (in the song "Olvídalo") and Tony Touch (in the song "El Fogueo"). He also collaborated with Venegas on the song "Primer Día".

Discography

Studio albums 
Elevado [High] (2002)
El Apagón [The Blackout] (2007)
Pyramide (2010)
Puñal (2017)
Mesa Dulce (2022)

Live albums 
Niguiri Sessions (2020)

Singles 
Donde Vas [Where are you going?] (2003)
En La Mía [My own way] (2007)
Olvidalo [Forget about it] (feat. Julieta Venegas) (2008)
Seas Quien Seas [Whoever you are] (2008)
Mostro [Monster] (2010)
Pa Trás [Street talk for "Going Backwards"] (feat. Residente Calle 13) (2010)
Pyramide (2011)
Gisela (2011)
Mi Vida [My life] (2017)
Soltar (2018)
Pesadilla Remix (feat. Neo Pistéa) (2018)
Puñal (2018)
Aves (2020)
1000 Flashes (2021)
El Lado Oscuro Del Corazón (2022)

Featured Singles 
Primer día [First day] (collaborated with Julieta Venegas) (2006)

References

External links 
Dante Spinetta

1976 births
Living people
Argentine male guitarists
21st-century Argentine male singers
Argentine people of Italian descent
Rhythm and blues singers
Soul singers
21st-century guitarists
Latin music songwriters